{{DISPLAYTITLE:L-Glucose}}

-Glucose is an organic compound with formula C6H12O6 or O=CH[CH(OH)]5H, specifically one of the aldohexose monosaccharides.  As the -isomer of glucose, it is the enantiomer of the more common -glucose.

-Glucose does not occur naturally in living organisms, but can be synthesized in the laboratory. -Glucose is indistinguishable in taste from -glucose, but cannot be used by living organisms as a source of energy because it cannot be phosphorylated by hexokinase, the first enzyme in the glycolysis pathway.  One of the known exceptions is in Burkholderia caryophylli, a plant pathogenic bacterium, which contains the enzyme -threo-aldose 1-dehydrogenase which is capable of oxidizing -glucose.

Like the -isomer, -glucose usually occurs as one of four cyclic structural isomers—α- and β--glucopyranose (the most common, with a six-atom ring), and α- and β--glucofuranose (with a five-atom ring). In water solution, these isomers interconvert in matters of hours, with the open-chain form as an intermediate stage.

Uses
-Glucose was once proposed as a low-calorie sweetener and it is suitable for patients with diabetes mellitus, but it was never marketed due to excessive manufacturing costs.

The acetate derivative of -glucose, -glucose pentaacetate, was found to stimulate insulin release, and might therefore be of therapeutic value for type 2 diabetes. -Glucose was also found to be a laxative, and has been proposed as a colon-cleansing agent which would not produce the disruption of fluid and electrolyte levels associated with the significant liquid quantities of bad-tasting osmotic laxatives conventionally used in preparation for colonoscopy.

References

External links

Aldohexoses
Sugar substitutes
Laxatives